Happily Ever After is a British television sitcom which first aired on ITV in two series between 1961 and 1964.

Actors who made guest appearances on the show include Joan Benham, Derek Benfield and Reginald Marsh.

Cast
 Dora Bryan as Dora Morgan
 Pete Murray as Peter Morgan
 Bryan Coleman as  Harry Watkins
 Audrey Noble as Grace Watkins

References

Bibliography

External links
 

ITV sitcoms
1961 British television series debuts
1964 British television series endings
1960s British comedy television series
English-language television shows
Television shows produced by ABC Weekend TV
Television shows shot at Teddington Studios